Thomas Casey  (1765 – 8 May 1840) was an Irish politician and barrister who was a Member of Parliament for Kilmallock in the Irish House of Commons from 1800 to 1801.

From 1808 to 1824, he served as Barrister-Magistrate at Marlborough Street.

Casey was the only son of Thomas Casey and Helen O'Houghragan. He married firstly Anna de Cloisé. After her death, he married secondly Wilhelmina Forth, daughter and co-heir of Neville Forth of Newton House, County Meath. With his second wife, he had two daughters: Anna Alicia, who married Rev. William Ogle Moore, Dean of Clogher; and Helen Matilda, and a son, Edmond Henry Casey. Thomas Casey Lyons was his grandson.

Casey died 8 May 1840 at Ely Place, Dublin and was buried at Coolock. Following his death, the Dublin Evening Mail wrote of him:

References  

18th-century Irish lawyers
1765 births
1840 deaths
Members of the Parliament of Ireland (pre-1801) for County Limerick constituencies
19th-century Irish lawyers